Shamrock High School is a public high school located in Shamrock, Texas, U.S. and classified as a 2A school by the UIL. It is part of the Shamrock Independent School District located in south central Wheeler County. In 2015, the school was rated "Met Standard" by the Texas Education Agency.

Athletics
The Shamrock Irish compete in these sports - 

Baseball
Basketball
Cross Country
Football
Golf
Track and Field

State Titles
Boys Golf - 
1958(1A), 1998(1A)
Girls Golf - 
2006(1A)
Girls Track - 
2002(1A), 2003(1A)

Notable People
Luke Breitschopf - Winner of the 2020 Street Stock Revival

References

External links
Shamrock ISD

Public high schools in Texas